Paradiacheopsis is an genus of slime molds in the family Amaurochaetaceae. It was first described by Ralph Joao George Hertel in 1954, and the type species is Paradiacheopsis curitibana.

References ..

External links
Paradiacheopsis occurrence data from GBIF

Myxogastria
Amoebozoa genera

Taxa described in 1954